RVS may refer to:

 R.V.S., Arkady Gaidar novel
 Repetitive visual stimulus
 Revolutionary Military Council, the Red Army's central command organization
 Revolutionary Military Soviet (Makhnovshchina), (Russian:Революционный Военный Совет), a Ukrainian anarchist organization
 Ricky Van Shelton
 RVS III, Shelton's third album
 Rocky View Schools
RVS College of Arts and Science, in Coimbatore, Tamil Nadu
 RVS College of Engineering & Technology, in Dindigul, Tamil Nadu
 Royal Voluntary Service, British charity
 Tulsa Riverside Airport, a public-use airport in Tulsa, Oklahoma, US; IATA and FAA airport code